Kasun Kalhara Jayawardhana (Sinhala: කසුන් කල්හාර ජයවර්ධන ) (born 3 November 1981), known professionally as Kasun Kalhara, is a Sri Lankan singer, musician, vocal coach and record producer. During his musical career, Kasun has released three albums, Haritha Nimnaye, Radical Premaya and Romantic Opera. He is one of the biggest and best-selling music artists in Sri Lanka.

Biography

Kasun was born in Rajagiriya, Sri Lanka on 3 November 1981. His mother, Malani Bulathsinhala, was a veteran vocalist and his father H. M. Jayawardena was a renowned composer. He had a younger sister, Nirmani Chaya who died in 1991 at the age of three.

Kalhara's music career started along with Indrachapa Liyanage and his schoolmates from Ananda College in the year 2000. His mother was highly supportive of his musical career. Once a newspaper interviewer asked her "what is the most memorable day in your life?" and she answered "the day Maestro Premasiri Khemadasa hugged and wished my son Kasun Kalhara, following his first musical concert (Waves of Introspection). That warm hug from Maestro Kemadasa guaranteed that Kasun had a genuine talent and a clear future".

Kasun has held a number of solo concerts, collaborating with other artists such as "Kasun Kalhara: Live in Concert", "Kasun Kalhara Unforgettable Live in Concert", "The Black Red White Concert", "Kasun Kalhara in Culture Shock", "4U: Live in Concert" and "Love U: Live in Concert".

Kasun Kalhara performed in Culture Shock (2013) and Kasun Kalhara in LoveU (2016–2017) Those three concerts became one of the most attended musical shows in history of Sri Lanka with over 5,000 fans gathering around at the Nelum Pokuna Mahinda Rajapaksa Theatre for all the three events.

Television Shows

Discography

Albums
Haritha Nimnaye (2001)
Radical Premaya (2005)
Romantic Opera (2008)

With other artists
Ananthayata (with Indrachapa Liyanage)
Aadara Mal Wala (with Indrachapa Liyanage)
Aathmaabhimaanayay (with Indrachapa Liyanage)
Aadaraneeya Wassaanaya (with Uresha Ravihari)
Pamaawee Pipuna (with Indika Upamali)
Raaththriya Manaram (with Nirosha Virajini)
Samagi Samaadana (with Malani Bulathsinhala)
Sanda Ahimi (with Pradeepa Dharmadasa) 
Shuunya Wuu Nagaraye (with Samitha Mudunkotuwa)
Veenaawee Urathalaye (with Indrachapa Liyanage)
Sanda Eliya (Moonlight) (with Indrachapa Liyanage)
Sihinayata Tharam (with Prathibha Prabha)
Malakai Kiya (with Kushani Sandareka)
Sara Sande (with Kushani Sandareka)
Adare (Adaraneeya Kathawak Movie Song) (With Kushani Sandareka)
Ahasin Eha (Adaraneeya Kathawak Movie Song) (Uresha Ravihari)

Singles
 Mage Diwi Pana Nala Rakinne (Sinhala Hymn)
 Ma Balawath Karana Samide (Sinhala Hymn)
 Sanda Mithuri (2009)
 Meedum Dumaraye (2009)
 Math Mal Sena (2011)
 Mata Kiya Denna (2011)
 Nawathi Methekin (2012)
 Adarema Geethayak (2013)
 Atheethaye Ma (2015)
 Kadadasi Oru (2015)
 Lowa Dutuwe Amma (2015)
 Lihiniye (2015)
 Ithin Hadamu Api Aluth Ratak (Let's Make A New Country) - Produced with Rookantha Gunathilake for the victory of New Democratic Front (Sri Lanka) at the 2015 Sri Lankan presidential election
 Sri Lanka Cricket Theme Song (2016)
 Varamale (2016)
 Me Obata Ahenawada (Adaraneeya Kathawak Movie Song 2016)
 Vasilissa (2016)
 Alaye Ghatha (2016)
 Nagena Bindena (2017)
 Melaa (2017)
 Wahilihiniye (2017)
 Nodaneema Awasan Una (2018)
 Nela (2018) 
 Hanthana Nathimuth J'Pure (2020)
 Roopakartha Adariye (2021)
 Ruwanarini (2021)
 Hitha Heena Aran (2021)
 Banchimaari (2022)
 Paradeesaye Jawayai Me (2022)

External links
 Kasun Kalhara Guitar Chords

References

21st-century Sri Lankan male singers
1982 births
Living people
Sinhalese singers